M v H [1999] 2 S.C.R. 3, is a landmark decision of the Supreme Court of Canada on the rights of same-sex couples to equal treatment under the Constitution of Canada.

Background 
M v H was on the appeal of a case originally brought by a lesbian couple, Joanne Mitchell ("M") and Lorraine McFarland ("H"). The initials belonged to their lawyers.

On May 19, 1999, Justice Gloria Epstein—who was, at that time, of the Ontario Superior Court of Justice—ruled that the exclusion of same-sex couples from the definition of common-law spouse under section 29 of the Ontario Family Law Act was in violation of equality rights under section 15(1) of the Canadian Charter of Rights and Freedoms, and could not be justified under section 1 of the Charter, which allows only "such reasonable limits prescribed by law as can be demonstrably justified in a free and democratic society." The ruling was appealed by Ontario Premier Mike Harris to the Court of Appeal for Ontario, which upheld the ruling, and then to the Supreme Court.

Ruling 
According to the Supreme Court's ruling, the nature of the interest protected by s. 29 of the FLA is fundamental.  The exclusion of same-sex partners from the benefits of s. 29 promotes the view that M., and individuals in same-sex relationships generally, are less worthy of recognition and protection.  It implies that they are judged to be incapable of forming intimate relationships of economic interdependence as compared to opposite-sex couples, without regard to their actual circumstances.  Such exclusion perpetuates the disadvantages suffered by individuals in same‑sex relationships and contributes to the erasure of their existence.

This ruling did not affect the legal definition of marriage, and applied only to cohabiting partners in a common-law marriage, who have significantly fewer rights than married spouses in some areas, especially relating to division of property upon separation.

As a remedy, the Court struck down section 29 altogether rather than read in any necessary changes, but the ruling was suspended for six months to give the province time to change it.  The section was subsequently amended by the Legislative Assembly of Ontario to include all common-law spouses, whether same-sex or different-sex.

According to R. Douglas Elliott, one of the lawyers in the case, the ruling dealt "a body blow to discrimination" in Canada:  "This important decision found that it was constitutionally imperative under the Canadian Charter for laws to provide equal treatment of same-sex common-law couples and opposite-sex common-law couples. . . .  [The Supreme Court] called upon the lawmakers of Canada to rectify all Canadian laws, rather than force gays and lesbians to resort to the Courts.

See also
 List of Supreme Court of Canada cases (Lamer Court)
 Same-sex marriage in Canada

References

External links
 
Ontario Court of Appeals decision on Canlii.org
"A spouse is a spouse, regardless of gender," article from The Globe and Mail, 21 May 1999, reprinted at the website of Press for Change
"Supreme Court ruling redefines family," article from CBC News Online, 20 May 1999, reprinted at the website of Press for Change
"Gay couples win rights," article from The Globe and Mail, 21 May 1999, reprinted at the website of Press for Change
"Vive le Québec gai," article (in English) from The Globe and Mail, 22 May 1999, reprinted at the website of Press for Change
Transcript of a discussion on CBC between Brenda Cossman and Ted Morton on the legal implications of the M. v. H. ruling, October 1999

Same-sex marriage in Canada
Family law in Canada
Section Fifteen Charter case law
Supreme Court of Canada cases
Same-sex union case law
1999 in Canadian case law
1999 in LGBT history
Canadian LGBT rights case law
Common-law marriage